Montigny Glacier is a steep tributary glacier in the Bowers Mountains of Antarctica, flowing eastward and at the terminus coalescing with Irwin Glacier (from the south), with which it enters the larger Graveson Glacier. Montigny Glacier was mapped by the United States Geological Survey from surveys and U.S. Navy air photos, 1960–64, and was named by the Advisory Committee on Antarctic Names for glaciologist Raymond J. Montigny, who participated in the study of Meserve Glacier in 1966–67.

References

Glaciers of Pennell Coast